Burtoft is a hamlet in the civil parish of Wigtoft, Lincolnshire, England,  approximately  southwest of the market town of Boston.

Burtoft is mentioned in the Domesday Book of 1086.

References

External links

Villages in Lincolnshire